Ovan (also Romanized as Āvān and Ovan; also known as Anwān) is a village in Moallem Kalayeh Rural District, Rudbar-e Alamut District, Qazvin County, Qazvin Province, Iran. At the 2006 census, its population was 368, in 128 families.  Avan is located on Ovan Lake.

References 

Populated places in Qazvin County